Joseph Beerli (22 December 1901 – 4 September 1967) was a Swiss bobsledder who competed from the mid-1930s to the late 1940s. At the 1936 Winter Olympics in Garmisch-Partenkirchen, he won a gold medal in the four-man and a silver in the two-man events.

Beerli also won three medals at the FIBT World Championships with one gold (four-man: 1939), one silver (four-man: 1935) and one bronze (two-man: 1938). He retired after the 1947 World Championships and until his death in 1967 ran his sports shop.

References

External links

 Bobsleigh two-man Olympic medalists 1932-56 and since 1964
 Bobsleigh four-man Olympic medalists for 1924, 1932-56, and since 1964
 Bobsleigh two-man world championship medalists since 1931
 Bobsleigh four-man world championship medalists since 1930
 DatabaseOlympics.com profile
 Biography of Joseph Beerli

1901 births
1967 deaths
Swiss male bobsledders
Olympic bobsledders of Switzerland
Bobsledders at the 1936 Winter Olympics
Olympic gold medalists for Switzerland
Olympic silver medalists for Switzerland
Olympic medalists in bobsleigh
Medalists at the 1936 Winter Olympics
20th-century Swiss people